Anisota is a genus of moths in the family Saturniidae first described by Jacob Hübner in 1820. Their caterpillars are known commonly as oakworms. They are defoliators of oaks.

Species
 Anisota assimilis (Druce, 1886)
 Anisota consularis Dryar, 1896
 Anisota dissimilis (Boisduval, 1872)
 Anisota finlaysoni Riotte, 1969
 Anisota kendallorum Lemaire, 1988
 Anisota leucostygma (Boisduval, 1872)
 Anisota manitobensis McDunnough, 1921
 Anisota oslari Rothschild, 1907 - Oslar's oakworm moth
 Anisota peigleri Riotte, 1975 - yellowstriped oakworm
 Anisota punctata Riotte & Peigler, 1982
 Anisota senatoria (Smith, 1797) - orangestriped oakworm
 Anisota stigma (Fabricius, 1775) - spiny oakworm moth
 Anisota virginiensis (Drury, 1773) - pink-striped oakworm moth

References

External links

Ceratocampinae
Moth genera